The Coconut Grove Playhouse was a theatre in the Coconut Grove neighborhood of Miami, Florida, United States. The building was originally constructed as a movie theater called the Player's State Theater. It opened on January 3, 1927, as a part of the Paramount chain. The movie house was designed by the architect Richard Kiehnel of Kiehnel and Elliott. It was built by local realtors Irving J. Thomas and Fin L. Pierce. Albert Peacock was the contractor.

The theater was renowned as the second movie theatre on the east coast of Florida to be air conditioned and having the largest Wurlitzer organ in the United States. It was used for a variety of shows until closing in 2006. It has not been used since.  It was listed on the National Register of Historic Places in 2018.

History
In the 1950s George Engle, an oilman, bought it and spent over $1 million (equivalent to $47 million in 2017) in renovations having the architect Alfred Browning Parker convert it to a live theatre. It reopened on January 3, 1956, with the US premiere of Samuel Beckett’s Waiting for Godot, starring Bert Lahr and Tom Ewell.

In the fifty years that have followed, the Playhouse has played host to many of theater's most renowned performers, including Maureen Stapleton, Hume Cronyn, Jessica Tandy, Eve Arden, Tallulah Bankhead, Carol Channing, Liza Minnelli, Linda Lavin, Bea Arthur, George C. Scott, Colleen Dewhurst, Ethel Merman, and Raúl Esparza.

Use by Miami Actors Company
Between 1964 and 1965, The Coconut Grove Playhouse was used by The Miami Actors Company, which was meant to be an extension of the National Theatre and Academy. The brainchild of Ilse Earl, who taught theatre classes at Miami Dade College, launched this effort. Only 20 actors from Miami and surrounding areas were chosen to become part of this historic event, out of more than 100 or so of those who were asked to audition.

The company was reviewed by The Miami Herald theatre critic at that time. Shows involved, among others, were J.B. by Archibald MacLeish; All the Way Home by Tad Mosel; and Slow Dance on the Killing Ground by William Hanley. Slow Dance was a hurried replacement which had to be put in place within ten days of rehearsal, replacing Hogan's Goat.

Change in artistic director
In 1982, actor-director José Ferrer was named Artistic Director, and under his supervision the Playhouse gained a reputation as one of the nation's leading theatres. In 1985, Arnold Mittelman was selected after a national search to succeed Mr. Ferrer. Among the productions that premiered here prior to a Broadway opening are Neil Simon’s The Sunshine Boys, starring Jack Klugman and Tony Randall, and Urban Cowboy. Sherry Glaser’s Family Secrets moved to off-Broadway and became its longest running one-woman show. The Playhouse presented the world premiere of Fame: The Musical, which went on to great success in Baltimore, Philadelphia, and London’s West End, and mounted a revival of Death of a Salesman, starring Hal Holbrook and Elizabeth Franz, prior to a national tour. The theatre now has two stages, the 1700-seat proscenium Mainstage Theater and the intimate 100-seat Encore Room Theater.

In-School Touring Program
The Playhouse provided a broad range of programs for all ages, including the In-School Touring Program, which presented plays aimed at students in grades six through twelve, Lizard Lessons, original plays with music for kindergarten through third grade, a Summer Theater Camp for teens, and Theater Stages, which teaches acting techniques, playwriting, costume and scenery design, and improvisation to children, teens, and adult performers.

Other uses
On November 22, 1996, Late Show with David Letterman originated from the theater. It was the last episode of the show not to originate from New York.

Closing and acquisition by Miami-Dade County
The Coconut Grove Playhouse closed in 2006 due to an accumulated debt, which many believed was due to the high operating costs of running the large 1,130-seat theatre. The theatre remains closed to this date.  In January 2014, however, Miami-Dade County received permission from the State of Florida to take over the building.

Proposals for future operation of the venue 
At the time of the Miami-Dade County takeover, there were several ideas for the use of the space. The current plan approved by the State of Florida is for a 300-seat theatre at the venue to be operated by GableStage, a renowned South Florida theatre company currently operating in a 150-seat theatre at the historic Biltmore Hotel. GableStage would work in association with Florida International University and their theatre department, working with them to provide students there with professional, real world experience.  At the time of the approval, the City of Miami government waived 1.5 million dollars worth of previously accumulated building violation fees.

This plan was rivaled by a proposal for creating a 700-seat theatre at the space. The group presenting this proposal was led by Mike Eidson, trust chairman at the Adrienne Arsht Center, a large performance complex in downtown Miami. Eidson's involvement in the deal was separate from his position at the Arsht Center. Kevin Spacey was cited as a backer of the plan, with Eidson claiming that he would be interested in serving as an advisor in the project and possibly working as an artistic director upon reopening. Spacey worked in a similar position in reviving London's Old Vic Theatre. This proposal was not passed, however it is still being considered as an option. A county chairman encouraged Eidson to "postpone" his plans, suggesting that the idea is not completely out of sight.

The 700-seat theatre option has received mixed reviews. Ann Anthony, executive director of Miami's Mad Cat Theatre Company, is one of the plan's many opponents. She cited the difficulty of filling a large theatre and the presence of two large theatres nearby, the Miracle Theatre and the venues at the Adrienne Arsht Center. Many people support the plan though, hoping that with Kevin Spacey's backing that the theatre could bring in big stars and become a prominent regional theatre once again.

Renovation and restoration of the venue 
After a long bidding process between nine architecture firms, Miami-Dade county commissioners voted for Arquitectonica to restore the venue and bring it up to current building codes. $20 million in voter-approved bond money has been set aside to fund this project. The building is deemed a historical landmark so it cannot be fully demolished, but many residents are concerned that much of the building will not be preserved.

Preservation architect Richard Heisenbottle sketched a plan for the restoration of the venue that could fit the smaller 300-seat space and the 700-seat theatre proposed by Eidson, and keep most of the original exterior. Upon this development, Arquitectonica was tasked with looking into the budgetary requirements for this plan as well as how much of the historic architecture could be saved if the venue had two performance spaces.

References
Notes

Bibliography

 Cohen, Carol. Broadway by the Bay; Thirty Years at the Coconut Grove Playhouse. Miami, FL: Pickering Press, 1987. .
 

Archival Sources
 Finding aid to the Peter Harvey diaries, including production notes for the Coconut Grove Playhouse, at Columbia University. Rare Book & Manuscript Library.

Theatres in Florida
Culture of Miami
Buildings and structures in Miami
Playhouse
Theatres completed in 1926
Kiehnel and Elliott buildings
1927 establishments in Florida
2006 disestablishments in Florida
National Register of Historic Places in Miami